Imanabad (also Romanized as Īmanābād, Īmenābād, Eimanabad, and Eymanābād) is a village in Belesbeneh Rural District, Kuchesfahan District, Rasht County, Gilan Province, Iran. At the 2006 census, its population was 741, in 188 families.

References 

Populated places in Rasht County